Marlaine Nair is a South African politician. A member of the Democratic Alliance, she has been a member of the KwaZulu-Natal Legislature since 2022. She is a former DA eThekwini Councillor.

Political career
Nair served as a Democratic Alliance councillor of the eThekwini Metropolitan Municipality. She has been a member of the DA's Federal Legal Commission, the party's Provincial Management Committee, the DA's Provincial Executive Committee as well as the party's provincial finance committee. She was also the party's provincial fundraiser.

On 5 April 2022, Nair was sworn in as a member of the KwaZulu-Natal Legislature. She replaced former DA MPL Mbali Ntuli who had resigned from the party a month earlier. She was appointed the DA's spokesperson on human settlements.

References

Living people
Year of birth missing (living people)
Place of birth missing (living people)
Members of the KwaZulu-Natal Legislature
South African people of Indian descent
Democratic Alliance (South Africa) politicians
People from Durban